The Nervures Valluna is a French single-place paraglider that was designed by Xavier Demoury and produced by Nervures of Soulom. It is now out of production.

Valluna means "dream's door" in the Quechuan language.

Design and development
The Valluna was designed as an intermediate glider and was one of the first gliders to be certified to the then-new CEN standards. The models are each named for their relative size.

The Valluna Bivouac was designed as a lighter weight version of the basic Valluna for bivouac flying. The Valluna II reduced line drag through the use of fewer and unsheathed lines. It was not certified.

The Valluna was replaced in production by the Nervures Faïal.

Variants
Valluna S
Small-sized model for lighter pilots. Glide ratio is 8:1. The glider model is CEN Standard certified.
Valluna M
Mid-sized model for medium-weight pilots. Glide ratio is 8:1. The glider model is CEN Standard certified.
Valluna L
Large-sized model for heavier pilots. Glide ratio is 8:1. The glider model is CEN Standard certified.
Valluna XL
Extra large-sized model for much heavier pilots. Glide ratio is 8.1:1. The glider model is CEN Standard certified.

Specifications (Valluna M)

References

External links
Official website

Valluna
Paragliders